Sherman Montgomery Kennedy (November 1, 1878 – July 31, 1945) was a professional baseball player. He was an outfielder for one season (1902) with the Chicago Orphans. In his career, he collected no hits in 5 at bats.

He was born in Conneaut, Ohio and died in Pasadena, Texas at the age of 66.

External links

1878 births
1945 deaths
Chicago Orphans players
Major League Baseball outfielders
Baseball players from Ohio
Nashville Vols players
Birmingham Barons players
Shreveport Pirates (baseball) players